Araceli Navarro Laso (born August 9, 1989) is a Spanish sabre fencer. She won one of the bronze medals in the women's sabre event at the 2022 World Fencing Championships held in Cairo, Egypt. Navarro represented Spain at the 2008 Summer Olympics in Beijing, where she competed in the women's individual sabre event.

At the Olympics, she defeated Mexico's Angelica Larios in the preliminary round of sixty-four, before she was forced to retire in her next match against United States' Rebecca Ward, because of a dislocated left shoulder injury, with a score of 7–12.

References

External links
Profile – FIE
EuroFencing Profile
NBC Olympics Profile

1989 births
Living people
Fencers from Madrid
Spanish female sabre fencers
Olympic fencers of Spain
Fencers at the 2008 Summer Olympics
Competitors at the 2013 Mediterranean Games
Competitors at the 2018 Mediterranean Games
Mediterranean Games competitors for Spain
Competitors at the 2022 Mediterranean Games
World Fencing Championships medalists
21st-century Spanish women